Lee Kelso is a former television news anchor. He is co-owner of a telecommunications consulting company, and freelance spokesman/host/actor seen in television commercials and corporate video productions. Since retiring from WANE-TV in Fort Wayne, he has worked as freelance anchor at WPTA-TV/WISE-TV, the ABC and NBC television affiliates in Fort Wayne, Indiana.

Career
Kelso began his television career in 1980 as co-host of PM Magazine on WANE-TV in Fort Wayne. PM Magazine was canceled and replaced by "Fort Wayne Afternoon", a program owned by WANE's parent company at that time.  Kelso produced and co-hosted that program until it was discontinued. Kelso migrated into the WANE-TV newsroom first as a general assignment reporter, and then as a news anchor. He started anchoring local news within the CBS Morning News, then anchored the WANE noon newscast scoring market leading ratings for many years.

He and co-anchor Karen Hensel (now at WISH-TV, Indianapolis) created First at 5, Fort Wayne's first 5pm newscast. Before long, he anchored the 6pm and 11pm newscasts. Kelso left WANE in 1996 to assume co-ownership of Fort Wayne Internet.

In 2001, Kelso and two partners formed The BBK Group, Inc., offering telecommunication management services for corporate clients.

Kelso returned to television in a part-time capacity hosting a weekly health information program titled "HealthLine" on WFWA, the PBS station in Fort Wayne.

He formed StreamStudio to provide online streaming services, and created HealthCall, a weekly health news updated that airs weekly on WOWO AM/FM and is streamed live on Facebook.

He appeared in comedic and dramatic roles in community theater productions in 2009 and 2010, and often appears in television commercials and corporate video presentations.

References

External links
www.healthcall.live

Television anchors from Fort Wayne, Indiana
Living people
Year of birth missing (living people)